Queen of da Souf is the debut studio album by American rapper Latto (known at the time as Mulatto). It was released on August 21, 2020, by Streamcut Records and RCA Records. The album was supported by four singles: "Bitch from da Souf" remix featuring Saweetie and Trina, "Muwop" featuring Gucci Mane, "On God" and "In n Out" featuring City Girls. Queen of da Souf was also preceded by two promotional singles, "No Hook" and "He Say She Say". The album features guest appearances from Gucci Mane, City Girls, 21 Savage, 42 Dugg, Saweetie and Trina. The album debuted at number 44 on the Billboard 200. An extended version was released on December 11, 2020.

Background
In 2019, Latto broke through with her single "Bitch from da Souf" and consequently went on to sign a record deal with RCA Records in early 2020. The single peaked at number 95 on the Billboard Hot 100 chart and was certified Gold by the RIAA in the United States. The song later received a remix featuring rappers Saweetie and Trina. The remix was featured on both her 2019 Hit the Latto EP as well as Queen of da Souf. A day prior to the album's announcement, it was revealed that Mulatto would be included on XXLs 2020 Freshman Class. On August 12, 2020, Mulatto went on her social media accounts to announce the release of Queen of da Souf and revealed the cover art alongside the release date. Three days later, Mulatto revealed the track listing for the album, but replaced all unknown guest appearances with emojis, opting for her fans to guess the features. Mulatto revealed the features on August 19, which included the rapper duo City Girls and Georgian rapper 21 Savage.

Singles
The album's lead single, "Bitch from da Souf" was released in January 2019 and became Mulatto's breakout hit. The remix version featuring Saweetie and Trina was released in December 2019 and appear on the album.

The album's first promotional single "No Hook" was released on April 23, 2020. The song was Mulatto's first official release since announcing she had signed to RCA Records and was released alongside its music video. "No Hook" tells Mulatto's come up story to stardom in a single verse, hence the title. One month later, "He Say She Say" was released alongside a "quarantine style" music video as the album's second promotional single.

"Muwop" featuring Gucci Mane was released on July 30, 2020, as the album's official second single after Mulatto recreated Mane's album covers on her social media. The song samples Mane's 2007 single "Freaky Gurl" and was released alongside its music video. The single was serviced to US Rhythmic radio on August 25, 2020.

The album's third single, "On God", had a music video released on Lyrical Lemonade's YouTube account on September 10, 2020.

"In n Out", featuring American rap duo City Girls, was released as the album's fourth single and received a music video which was released on October 15, 2020.

"Sex Lies" featuring Lil Baby was released as the first single from the extended version of the album and the fifth overall. A music video was premiered on December 11, 2020.

Other songs
A music video for the opening track, "Youngest and Richest", was premiered on the release date of the album. A music video for the extended version album track, "Spend It", was released on December 22, 2020. The video portrays Mulatto going to a local Walmart and purchasing essential items for the community.

Music and lyrics 
According to the BrooklynVegan, "Queen of Da Souf is full of sex-positive anthems that are overflowing with charisma and confidence". On "Muwop", Latto "twists Gucci Mane’s 2006 hit, “Freaky Gurl” with a feminine flare." On "No Hook", she "bravely talks about her pregnancy scares, her terrible relationships, and her rough come-up". On "Bitch from da Souf Remix", the rappers "trade off and spit bars representative of their respective hometowns–Atlanta, Miami and the Bay Area."

Critical reception 

Fred Thomas of AllMusic rated the album 3.5 out of 5 stars. He commented that it "taps into the same irrepressible swagger and irreverent charm of Latto's runaway hits "No Hook," and "B*tch from Da Souf" and pads out the material with plentiful features from established artists."

Quincy of Ratings Game Music gave the album a C rating. He wrote that "Mulatto has a bright future and the aura of someone that can end up being one of the greats."

Michael Penn of VMP wrote that Latto shows her versatility by adjusting to featuring artists' styles and choosing beats that suit her attitude.

Alphonse Pierre of Pitchfork criticized the album, which "is held back by production that seems like it was chosen by someone who hasn’t listened to Atlanta rap in at least half a decade."

Year-end lists

Track listing

Personnel

 Bankroll Got It – production (1, 5-7, 13, 18)
 Boadray – production (2, 6, 9, 13)
 Diego Ave – production (5-7, 18)
 Mark Bankhead, Jr. – production (4, 9)
 RTJ – production (4, 9)
 Hitmaka – production (5, 10)
 BricksDaMane – production (8, 12)
 Pooh Beatz – production (8, 15, 17)
 Johnny Dutra – production (3, 14)
 IAmXayy – production (8, 17)
 J. White Did It – production (2)
 Murda Beatz – production (3)
 Bijan Amir – production (4)
 Jae Roc – production (5)
 ThaOnlySensei – production (9)
 SkipOnDaBeat – production (10)
 Tha Genius – production (11)
 Ghost-Kid Da Produca – production (11)
 Go Grizzly – production (12)
 Rice N’ Peas – production (12)
 Robot Scott – production (12)
 Kid Hazel – production (14)
 JetsonMade – production (15)
 DJ Shawdi P – production (15)
 The Loopholes – production (16)
 London Jae – production (17)
 Los the Producer – production (17)

Charts

References 

2020 debut albums
Latto albums
RCA Records albums